Thennes is a commune in the Somme department in Hauts-de-France in northern France.

Geography

Population

History
Known as Tanes in 1128, because of the tanneries in the area, it became known as Thannes then Thannes-Thennes in 1507. 
The history of Thennes has always been closely linked with that of the neighbouring commune of Berteaucourt-les-Thennes. 
From 780, Thennes was the property of the abbey at Corbie, later, as a fiefdom, it passed to the seigneurs of Boves, before returning to Corbie in the 13th century.
Thennes has seen more than its fair share of war: 
 During the 16th century against the Spanish, particularly with the siege of Corbie in 1636.  Some boatmen of Thennes and  burned the Spanish supplies destined for their troops outside Corbie. Louis XIII subsequently exempted them and their descendants from all taxes.
 During the Napoleonic wars of 1814–1815, Cossacks were seen in the commune.
 The Franco-Prussian War of 1870, saw the town very tested. Battles at nearby Mézières and Cachy saw two local men die, of the 22 men who fought.
 During the First World War, being so close to the front line meant the town was all but destroyed.

See also
Communes of the Somme department

References

External links

 Thennes official website 
 Personal website about Thennes 

Communes of Somme (department)